Kugler is a German surname. Notable people with the surname include:
 
Franz Theodor Kugler (1808-1858), German writer and art historian
Franz Xaver Kugler (1862-1929), German chemist, mathematician, astronomer and Assyriologist
Hans Gottfried Kugler (1893–1986), Swiss geologist
Israel Kugler (1917-2007) American professor of sociology
Jehoshua Kugler (1916-2007), Israel entomologist 
Richard Kugler, American writer
Sean Kugler (born 1966), American football coach
Victor Kugler, also known as 'Mr Kraler', one of the people who helped hide Anne Frank and her family during the Nazi occupation of the Netherlands

Variations of the name include, but are not limited to: Coughler,  Kooglar, Coughlin,  Koeler, Coughlan, Coglar, Koglar, Koglin

See also
Kugler Township, Minnesota, U.S.
Kugler (crater), a crater on the Moon
Crosby-Kugler capsule, a surgical device used for obtaining biopsies of the bowel

German-language surnames